The Buffalo Bandits are a lacrosse team based in Buffalo, New York playing in the National Lacrosse League (NLL). The 2020 season is their 29th season in the NLL. Due to the COVID-19 pandemic, the season was suspended on March 12, 2020. On April 8, the league made a further public statement announcing the cancellation of the remaining games of the 2020 season and that they would be exploring options for playoffs once it was safe to resume play.

Regular season

Final standings

Game log

Cancelled games

Roster

Entry Draft
The 2019 NLL Entry Draft took place on September 17, 2019. The Bandits made the following selections:

References

Buffalo
Buffalo Bandits seasons
Buffalo Bandits